Cruas is a commune near the river Rhône in the Ardèche department in southern France.

The village has a Romanesque abbey with a crypt.

Population

Sights and monuments 
Cruas has two notable monuments historiques
 Abbatiale Sainte-Marie:  church dating from the 11th and 12th centuries, listed since 1862 as a monument historique by the French Ministry of Culture.
 Château des Moines and its old village, a ruined 12 century to 15th century castle, listed since 1912.

See also
 Communes of the Ardèche department

References

External links
 Official web site
 Gazetteer entry
  
  

Communes of Ardèche
Ardèche communes articles needing translation from French Wikipedia